Magen Avot may refer to:

 The central paragraph of the Seven-Faceted Blessing, in Jewish liturgy
 Magen Avot (piyyut), inserted into that blessing
 The title of various books
 The responsa of Menahem Ha-me'iri
 The anti-Christian polemic by Simeon ben Zemah Duran
 Maghain Aboth Synagogue, in Singapore

See also  
 Avot (disambiguation)